(Main list of acronyms)


 h – (s) Hecto
 H – (s) Henry – Hydrogen

HA
 ha – (s) Hausa language (ISO 639-1 code) – Hectare
 HA – (s) Haiti (FIPS 10-4 country code) – (i) High Availability
 HAARP – (a) High Frequency Active Auroral Research Program
 HAART – (a) Highly Active Anti-Retroviral Therapy
 HAI – (i) Human Awareness Institute
 HAL – (i) Hardware Abstraction Layer
 HALO –
 (a) Habitation and Logistics Outpost (of the planned Lunar Gateway space station)
 High Altitude Low Opening (parachute jump)
 HALT
 (a) Highly Accelerated Life Test
 (a) Hungry Angry Lonely Tired
 HAMR – (a) Heat-assisted magnetic recording
 HANS – (a) Head And Neck Support (device used in many race cars)
 HARM – (a) High-speed Anti-Radiation Missile
 hat – (s) Haitian Creole language (ISO 639-2 code)
 HAT – (i/a) Highest Astronomical Tide (nautical charts) – (a) Hungarian Automated Telescope
 hau – (s) Hausa language (ISO 639-2 code)
 HAW – (i) Heavy Antitank Weapon
 HAWK – (a) Homing All the Way Killer (air defence system)
 HAZ – (i) Heat-Affected Zone
 HAZMAT – (p) Hazardous Materials

HB
 HBCD – (p) HexaBromoCycloDodecane
 HBCI – (i) Home Banking Computer Interface
 HBCU – (i) Historically black colleges and universities (U.S.)
 HBO – (i) Home Box Office
 HBR – (i) Harvard Business Review
 HBT – (i) Heterojunction Bipolar Transistor
 HBV – (i) Hepatitis B Virus

HC
 h.c. – (i) honoris causa (Latin, "for the sake of honour")
 HCCI – (i) Homogeneous Charge Compression Ignition
 HCF – (i) Highest Common Factor
 HCI – (i) Human–Computer Interaction/Interface
 HCPCS – (i) Health Care Procedure Coding System
 HCSC – (i) Higher Command and Staff Course
 HCT – (i) Higher Colleges of Technology, tertiary education institution in the United Arab Emirates (UAE)

HD
 HD
 (i) Henry Draper (star catalogue)
 Hull-Down (armored vehicle target, as opposed to Fully Exposed)
 High Definition
 Huntington's Disease
 HDD
 (i) Hard Disk Drive
 High-Density Disk
 HDL – (i) High-Density Lipoprotein
 HDM – (i) Human Decision-Making
 HDMI – High-Definition Multimedia Interface
 HDR
 (i) Hard disk recorder
 Henningson, Durham & Richardson (founders of the engineering and construction firm now known by their initials)
 High dynamic range, a term used in both digital imaging and 3D rendering
 Hot Dry Rock (experimental geothermal technology)
 Human Development Report (UN publication)
 HDRA – (i) Henry Doubleday Research Association
 HDTV – (p) High-definition television

HE
 he – (s) Hebrew language (ISO 639-1 code)
 He – (s) Helium
 HE – (a) High Explosive
 HEAT – (a) High-Explosive Anti-Tank (ammunition)
 heb – (s) Hebrew language (ISO 639-2 code)
 HEBA – (p) Hellenic Basketball Clubs Association
 HEER – (a) High-Explosive Extended Range (ammunition)
 HEIC – (i) Honourable East India Company
 HELOC – (a) Home equity line of credit
 HEMP – (a) High-Altitude Electromagnetic Pulse
 HEO
 (a) High Earth orbit
 (a) Highly elliptical orbit
 HEOSS – (a) High Earth Orbit Space Surveillance
 HEP – (i) High-Explosive Plastic (ammunition)
 HEPA – (a/i) High-Efficiency Particulate Air (filter)
 her – (s) Herero language (ISO 639-2 code)
 HESH – (a) High-Explosive, Squash-Head (ammunition)
 HESV – (i) Heavy Engineering Support Vehicle
 HETT – (a) Heavy Equipment Transporting Truck / Heavy Equipment Truck Tractor
 HEU – (i) Highly Enriched Uranium
 Hewitts – (a) Hills in England, Wales and Ireland over Two Thousand feet (with topographic prominence of at least 30 m)

HF
 Hf – (s) Hafnium
 HF – (i) High Frequency
 HFAC – (p) Human Factors ("aytchfak")
 HFE – (i) Human Fertilisation and Embryology (UK Act)
 HFE – (s) The common-emitter current gain in a BJT transistor (also represented by βF).  See: BJT
 HFEA – (i) Human Fertilisation and Embryology Authority (UK)

HG
 Hg – (i) Mercury (Latin Hydrargyrum)
 HGC – (i) UK Human Genetics Commission
 HGF – (i) Human Growth Factor
 HGTV – (i) Home & Garden Television

HH
 HHD – (p) humanitatum doctor (Latin, "doctor of humanities")
 HHB – Ha Ha Bonk – The noise made when you laugh your head off. Used instead of LOL...
 HHS – (i) (U.S. Department of) Health and Human Services

HI
 hi – (s) Hindi language (ISO 639-1 code)
 HI – (s) Hawaii (postal symbol)
 HIC – Hierarchical Ingredient Code, a system of classifying drug ingredients 
 HIDACZ – (p) High-Density Airspace Control Zone ("high dak zed/zee")
 HIH – (i) His (or Her) Imperial Highness
 HIM – (i) His (or Her) Imperial Majesty
 HIMAD – (p) High to Medium Altitude Air Defence (see also H/MAD)
 HIMEZ – (a) High Altitude Missile Engagement Zone
 HIMYM – How I Met Your Mother
 hin – (s) Hindi language (ISO 639-2 code)
 HIPAA – (i) U.S. Health Insurance Portability and Accountability Act
 Hipparcos – (p) HIgh Precision Parallax COllecting Satellite
 Hird – (a) Hurd of interfaces representing depth (cf. HURD)
 HiRISE – (p) High Resolution Imaging Science Experiment
 HIT – (a) Health Information Technology
 HIV – (i) Human Immunodeficiency Virus
 HIWT – (i) Hobart Institute of Welding Technology

HJ
 HJ – (i) hic jacet (Latin, "here lies")
 HJD – (i) Heliocentric Julian Day

HK
 HK – (s) Hong Kong (ISO 3166 digram; FIPS 10-4 territory code)
 HKD – (s) Hong Kong dollar (ISO 4217 currency code)
 HKG – (s) Hong Kong (ISO 3166 trigram)
 HKMAO – (i) Hong Kong and Macau Affairs Office
 HKO – (i) Hong Kong Observatory
 HKS – (i) HyperKinetic Syndrome
 HKSAR – (i) Hong Kong Special Administrative Region of the People's Republic of China

HL
 hL – (s) Hectolitre
 HL – (i) Holding Line
 HLA – (i) High Level Architecture (simulation) – Human Leukocyte Antigen
 HLL – (i) High-Level Language
 HLN – (i) Headline News
 HLOS – (i) High Level Output Specification
 HLS – (i) hoc loco situs (Latin, "laid in this place")
 HLVW – (i) Heavy Logistics Vehicle, Wheeled

HM
 HM – (s) Heard Island and McDonald Islands (ISO 3166 digram; FIPS 10-4 territory code)
 H/MAD – (p) High/Medium Altitude Air Defence ("aytchmad"; see also HIMAD)
 HMCE – (i) Her/His Majesty's Customs and Excise (former UK government department; succeeded by HM Revenue and Customs)
 HMCS
 (i) Her/His Majesty's Canadian Ship
 Her Majesty's Courts Service (former UK agency; succeeded by Her Majesty's Courts and Tribunals Service)
 HMD – (s) Heard and McDonald Islands (ISO 3166 trigram)
 HMF – (p) HydroxyMethyl Furfural
 HMM – (i) Hidden Markov model
 HMMWV – (i) High Mobility Multipurpose Wheeled Vehicle ("hum-vee"; "hummer")
 hmo – (s) Hiri Motu language (ISO 639-2 code)
 HMO – (i) Health maintenance organization
 HMO – (i) House in multiple occupation
 HMP – (i) Her Majesty's Prison
 HMRC – (i) Her/His Majesty's Revenue and Customs
 HMS
 (i) Helmet-mounted display
 Her/His Majesty's Ship (Royal Navy)
 HMSO – (i) Her Majesty's Stationery Office
 HMV – (i) His Master's Voice

HN
 HN – (s) Honduras (ISO 3166 digram)
 HND – (s) Honduras (ISO 3166 trigram)
 HNL – (s) Honduran lempira (ISO 4217 currency code)

HO
 ho – (s) Hiri Motu language (ISO 639-1 code)
 Ho – (s) Holmium
 HO – (s) Honduras (FIPS 10-4 country code)
 HOLLAND – (a) Hope Our Love Lasts And Never Dies
 HOMES – the Great Lakes; Huron, Ontario, Michigan, Erie, Superior
 HONY – Humans of New York, a photoblog. 
 HOPI – (a) Hybrid Optical and Packet Infrastructure (see Internet2, Abilene Network)
 HoReCa – (a) Hotel, Restaurant and Catering
 HORIZON – (p) Hélicoptère d'observation radar et d'investigation sur zone (French, Zone Investigation and Radar Observation Helicopter)
 HOSTAC – (a) Helicopter Operations from Ships Other Than Aircraft Carriers
 HOT – (a) Highly Optimised Tolerance
 HOTAS – (a) Hands on throttle-and-stick
 HOTT or HotT – (i) Hordes of the Things (miniature fantasy wargaming rules; a play on The Lord of the Rings)
 HOV – (i) High Occupancy Vehicle

HP
 hp – (s) horse power
 HP –
(i) Hewlett-Packard
Hindustan Petroleum
(s) Himachal Pradesh (Indian state code)
 HPA – (i) UK Health Protection Agency
 HPCL – (i) Hindustan Petroleum Corporation Limited
 HPGL or HP-GL – (i) Hewlett-Packard Graphics Language
 HP-IB – (i) Hewlett-Packard Instrument/Interface Bus (first implementation of GP-IB, later standardised and now known as IEEE-488)
 HP-IL – (i) Hewlett-Packard Interface Loop (serial bus used with some HP calculators and computers, notably the HP-41 and HP-71 series)
 HPLC – (i) High Performance Liquid Chromatography
 HPMOR – (i) Harry Potter and the Methods of Rationality (work of Harry Potter fan fiction)
 HPT – (i) High[er] Payoff Target
 HPV – (i) Human Papilloma Virus

HQ
 HQ –
(i) Headquarters
(s) Howland Island (FIPS 10-4 territory code)
 HQ – (i) High Quality 
 HQDA – (i) Headquarters, Department of the Army

HR
 hr – (s) Croatian language (ISO 639-1 code)
 HR
 (s) Croatia (FIPS 10-4 country code; ISO 3166 digram – from the country's native name of Hrvatska)
(s) Haryana (Indian state code)
 (i) Harvard Revised star catalogue
 Human Resources
 HRBL – (i) High-level Representation of Behavior Language (original name of the Herbal language)
 HRD – (i) Human Resource Development
 HRED – (i) (U.S. Army Research Laboratory's) Human Research and Engineering Directorate (Aberdeen Proving Ground, Maryland)
 HRF – (i) High Readiness Forces
 HRH – (i) His (or Her) Royal Highness
 HRK – (s) Croatian kuna (ISO 4217 currency code)
 HRM – (i) His (or Her) Royal Majesty
 HRM – (i) Human Resource Management
 HRT – (i) Hormone Replacement Therapy
 hrv – (s) Croatian language (ISO 639-2 code)
 HRV
 (s) Croatia (ISO 3166 trigram)
 (i) High Resolution Visible

HS
 Hs – (s) Hassium
  HSA – A health savings account available to taxpayers in the United States.
 HSBC – (i) The Hong Kong and Shanghai Banking Corporation
 HSC – (i) Higher School Certificate
 HSM – (i) High School Musical
 HSMAD – (i) Human Science/Modeling and Analysis Data
 HSN – (i) Home Shopping Network
 HSPH – (i) Harvard School of Public Health
 HSS
 (i) Health Service Support
 (i) High-Speed Steel
 HSSI – (i) High-Speed Serial Interface
 HST – see entry
 HSV
 (i) Herpes Simplex Virus
 Hue Saturation Value (colour model)

HT
 ht – (s) Haitian Creole language (ISO 639-1 code)
 HT
 (s) Haiti (ISO 3166 digram)
 (i) High Temperature
 hoc tempore (Latin, "at this time")
 hoc titulo (Latin, "under this title")
 HTA – (i) HyperText Application
 HTC
 High Tech Computer Corporation, original name of the company now known simply as HTC
 Horry Telephone Cooperative
 HTFU – (a) Harden The F**k Up
 HTG – (s) Haitian gourde (ISO 4217 currency code)
 HTH – (a) Hope That Helps
 HTI – (s) Haiti (ISO 3166 trigram)
 HTML – (i) HyperText Markup Language
 HTS – (i) High-Temperature Superconducting wire
 HTTP – (i) HyperText Transfer Protocol

HU
 hu- (s) Hungarian language (ISO 639-1 code)
 HU – (s) Hungary (ISO 3166 digram; FIPS 10-4 country code)
 HUD – (i/a) Head-Up Display – Housing and Urban Development
 HUF – (s) Hungarian forint (ISO 4217 currency code)
 HUHA – (a) Head up his/her ass (Marine salute; probably a backcronym)
 HUMINT – (p) Human Intelligence (military parlance)
 Hum-Vee – See HMMWV
 hun – (s) Hungarian language (ISO 639-2 code)
 HUN – (s) Hungary (ISO 3166 trigram)
 HURD – (a) Hird of Unix-Replacing Daemons (cf. Hird)
 HVU – (i) High Value Unit (military)

HV
 HV – (s) Upper Volta (ISO 3166 digram; obsolete 1984)
 HVAC – (s) Heating, ventilation and air conditioning Used in architecture, business and marketing; refers to a building's entire system of heating, moving, or cooling air.
 HVAP – (i) High Velocity Armour Piercing (ammunition)
 HVHF – (i)High velocity human factors
 HVM – (i) High Velocity Missile
 HVO – (s) Upper Volta (ISO 3166 trigram; obsolete 1984)
 HVP –
 (i) HarborView Properties
 High vacuum process
 Hydrolyzed vegetable protein
 High Velocity Protection
 H.V.P. (rapper)
 High Voltage Protection
 High Vapor Pressure
 High-Velocity Projectile
 High-Video Pass
 High-Velocity Particle
 Hub Voice Processor
 Human Variome Project

HW
 HW – (p) Hardware – (i) High Water (nautical charts)
 HWM – (i) Hardware morphing (computer graphics rendering)

HX
 HX –
 (s) IATA code of Hong Kong Airlines
 (s) Medical history
 (s) Hydrogen halide
 (s) Concept automobile by HUMMER
 HXB – (s) The glycoprotein Tenascian C

HY
 hy – (s) Armenian language (ISO 639-1 code)
 hye – (s) Armenian language (ISO 639-2 code)
 HYP
 (i) Halkın Yükselişi Partisi (Turkish: "People's Ascent Party"), a political party in Turkey
 Harvard, Yale, Princeton (perennially at or near the top of American university rankings)
 HYS – (i) Harvard, Yale, Stanford (perennially named as the top three law schools in the U.S.)

HZ
 hz – (s) Herero language (ISO 639-1 code)
 Hz – (s) Hertz
 HZ – (s) Haze (METAR Code)

Acronyms H